Gerrit Verdooren van Asperen (9 February 1757 – 30 October 1824) was a Dutch naval officer. He became a vice admiral.

He was born in Bergen op Zoom on 9 February 1757. Verdooren van Asperen joined the Batavian Navy in 1795, and was the commander of the Batavian 56-gun fourth rate ship of the line Delft during the Battle of Camperdown on 11 October 1797. He later became one of King Louis Bonaparte's rear admirals. He became vice admiral of the Royal Netherlands Navy in 1814 after the Kingdom of the Netherlands was founded.

He died on 30 October 1824 in Oost-Souburg.

External links
  Gerrit Verdooren van Asperen at the Biography Portal of the Netherlands

1757 births
1824 deaths
Dutch admirals
Dutch military personnel of the French Revolutionary Wars
People from Bergen op Zoom
18th-century Dutch military personnel